Mini and the Mozzies is a 2014 Danish animated children's film directed by Flemming Quist Møller and Jannik Hastrup from a screenplay by Møller, based on the eponymous series of children's books by Møller. Produced by Dansk Tegnefilm, Mini and the Mozzies was released in Danish theatres on 12 June 2014 by Nordisk Film Distribution.

References

External links 

2014 films
2014 animated films
2010s children's animated films
Danish animated films
2010s Danish-language films